Takanobu is a crater on Mercury.  Its name was adopted by the International Astronomical Union (IAU) in 1985. The crater is named for Japanese poet and portrait artist Fujiwara no Takanobu.

Takanobu lies about midway between the craters Gibran to the northwest and Mickiewicz to the southeast.

References

Impact craters on Mercury